Association Sportive Saint-Louisienne, commonly known as AS Saint-Louisienne, or simply as ASSL, is a football club from Saint-Louis, Réunion Island. The club plays their home matches at Stade Théophile Hoarau, which has a maximum capacity of 2,500 people.

Achievements
 Réunion Premier League: 16
1958, 1963, 1964, 1965, 1966, 1967, 1968, 1969, 1970, 1982, 1988, 1997, 1998, 2001, 2002, 2012.

 Coupe de la Réunion: 13
1964, 1968, 1969, 1970, 1981, 1987, 1995, 1996, 1998, 1999, 2002, 2013, 2021.

 Coupe D.O.M.: 4
1989, 1998, 1999, 2002

 Coupe D.O.M.–T.O.M.: 2
2000, 2003

Performance in CAF competitions
CAF Champions League: 5 appearances
1998 – Preliminary Round
1999 – Group Stage (Top 8)
2002 – First Round
2003 – First Round
2017 – First Round
CAF Cup Winners' Cup: 3 appearances
1996 – First Round
1997 – Semi-finals
2000 – Semi-finals

The club in the French football structure
 Coupe de France: 6 appearances
1994–95, 1995–96, 1996–97, 1997–98, 2002–03, 2014–15
{| class="wikitable" style="text-align: center"
|+ Ties won
! Year !! Round !! Home team (tier) !! Score !! Away team (tier)
|-
| 1994–95 || Round 7 || SAS Épinal (3) || 1–3 || Saint-Louisienne
|-
| 1994–95 || Round 8 || Saint-Louisienne || 1–1   || Chamois Niortais (2)
|-
| 1995–96 || Round 7 || Saint-Louisienne || 1–0 || La Roche-sur-Yon VF (3)
|-
| 1997–98 || Round 7 || Saint-Louisienne || 2–1 || La Roche-sur-Yon VF (4)
|-
| 2014–15 || Round 7 || GSI Pontivy (4) || 2–2   || Saint-Louisienne
|}

References

Saint-Louisienne
Association football clubs established in 1936
1936 establishments in Réunion
SS Saint-Louisienne